Ephraim Manessah Sykes (born July 17, 1985, in St. Petersburg, Florida) is an American actor and singer. Sykes played the role of George Eacker in the Broadway musical Hamilton.

In December 2016, he played Seaweed J. Stubbs in NBC's live production of Hairspray Live!. In 2017, Sykes originated the role of David Ruffin in the musical Ain't Too Proud, a stage musical based on the life of The Temptations.

Filmography
 30 Rock (2006)
 The Kennedy Center Honors (2010)
 Leave It on the Floor (2011) 
 Smash (2013)
 Vinyl (2016) – Marvin
 Hairspray Live! (2016) – Seaweed J. Stubbs
 Crisis in Six Scenes (2016)
 Detroit (2017) - Jimmy
 Hamilton (2020) - George Eacker
 Russian Doll (2022) - Derek, 3 episodes

Theatre

Awards and nominations

References

External links

Living people
American male television actors
American male musical theatre actors
American male stage actors
1985 births
Actors from St. Petersburg, Florida
21st-century American actors
Fordham University alumni